Beniarbeig is a municipality in the comarca of Marina Alta in the Valencian Community, Spain.

References

Municipalities in the Province of Alicante
Marina Alta